Jay Leonhart (born December 6, 1940) is a double bassist, singer, and songwriter who has worked in jazz and popular music. He has performed with Judy Garland, Bucky Pizzarelli, Carly Simon, Frank Sinatra, and Sting. Leonhart is noted for his clever songwriting, often laced with dry humor. His compositions have been recorded by Blossom Dearie, Lee Konitz, and Gary Burton. His poetry is published both in, and outside of, the venue of song.

Career
Leonhart grew up in a musical family. His parents and six siblings were all musically inclined. Everyone played the piano. By the age of seven, he and his older brother Bill were playing banjo, guitar, mandolin, and bass. They played country music and jazz. In their early teens, they were on TV in Baltimore and toured the country performing on banjo. When Leonhart was fourteen he started playing double bass in the Pier Five Dixieland Jazz Band in Baltimore.

After studying at the Peabody Institute (1946–1950), he attended the Berklee College of Music (1959–1961) and the Advanced School of Contemporary Music in Toronto.

In the early 1960s, he worked with Mike Longo and Buddy Morrow. At twenty one, he moved to New York City to start his career. He played road gigs with big bands, small bands, and singers. In 1968, he met and married a singer named Donna Zier and settled in New York.

Leonhart has worked with Louie Bellson, Urbie Green, Jim Hall, Lee Konitz, Marian McPartland, Gerry Mulligan, Mike Renzi, Don Sebesky, Chuck Wayne, and Phil Woods., Thad Jones, Mel Lewis, Lou Marini, and Tony Bennett. He has worked as a studio musician in several genres, for musicians such as James Taylor, Ozzy Osbourne, and Queen Latifah. He has also played in a duo with trombonist Wycliffe Gordon.

Between 1975 and 1995 he was named Most Valuable Bassist in the recording industry three times by the National Academy of Recording Arts and Sciences.

Leonhart has recorded many solo albums and has performed a one-man show called "The Bass Lesson" about his life in the music business. He has toured worldwide for more than forty years.

His son and daughter, Michael and Carolyn, have worked often with Steely Dan.

Discography

As leader
 Salamander Pie with Mike Renzi (DMP, 1983)
 There's Gonna Be Trouble with Joe Beck (Sunnyside, 1984)
 The Double Cross (Sunnyside, 1988)
 Life Out on the Road: A Jazz Journey (Prestige Elite, 1990)
 Live at Fat Tuesday's: May 13–15, 1993 (DRG, 1993)
 Four Duke with Joe Beck, Gary Burton, Terry Clarke (LaserLight, 1995)
 Sensitive to the Touch: The Music of Harold Arlen with Ken Peplowski (Groove Jams, 1998)
 Live at the 1996 Floating Jazz Festival with Bucky Pizzarelli, John Bunch (Chiaroscuro, 1998)
 Great Duets (Chiaroscuro, 1999)
 Galaxies and Planets (Sons of Sound, 2001)
 Rodgers & Leonhart (Sons of Sound, 2002)
 Tony's Tunes with John Bunch, Bucky Pizzarelli (Chiaroscuro, 2003)
 Fly Me to the Moon (Venus, 2004)
 Cool (Sons of Sound, 2004)
 Lost Songs of 1936 with Bucky Pizzarelli, Dick Hyman (Victoria, 2006)

With The New York Trio
 Blues in the Night (Venus, 2001)
 The Things We Did Last Summer (Venus, 2002)
 Love You Madly (Venus, 2003)
 Stairway to the Stars (Venus, 2004)
 Begin the Beguine (Venus, 2006)
 Thou Swell (Venus, 2007)
 Always (Venus, 2008)
 Stardust (Venus, 2009)

As guest
With Joe Beck
 Relaxin (DMP, 1983)
 Friends (DMP, 1984)
 Back to Beck (DMP, 1988)

With Louie Bellson
 Louie Bellson and His Jazz Orchestra (Musicmasters, 1987)
 Hot (Musicmasters, 1988)
 East Side Suite (Musicmasters, 1989)
 Airmail Special (Musicmasters, 1990)
 Peaceful Thunder (Jazz Heritage, 1993)

With Barbara Carroll
 From the Beginning (United Artists, 1977)
 Live at the Carlyle (DRG, 1991)
 This Heart of Mine (DRG, 1994)
 Everything I Love (DRG, 1995)
 Live at Birdland  (Harbinger, 2004)
 Sentimental Mood (Venus, 2006)
 I Wished on the Moon (Venus, 2007)
 Something to Live For (Harbinger, 2010)
 How Long Has This Been Going On? (Harbinger, 2011)

With Meredith D'Ambrosio
 Shadowland (Sunnyside, 1993)
 Echo of a Kiss (Sunnyside, 1998)
 Love Is for the Birds (Sunnyside, 2002)

With Michael Feinstein
 Recorded Live at Feinstein's at the Regency (Concord Jazz, 2000)
 Romance on Film, Romance on Broadway (Concord Jazz, 2000)
 Fly Me to the Moon (DuckHole, 2010)

With Eddie Higgins
 Music of Jobim: Speaking of Love (Venus, 2000)
 Don't Smoke in Bed (Venus, 2000)
 Bewitched (Venus, 2001)
 A Time for Love (Nola, 2002)
 Moonlight Becomes You (Venus, 2003)
 Dear Old Stockholm (Venus, 2003)
 Dear Old Stockholm Vol. 2 (Venus, 2003)
 If Dreams Come True (Venus, 2004)
 My Funny Valentine (Venus, 2005)
 Christmas Songs (Venus, 2006)
 It's Magic Vol. 1 (Venus, 2007)
 It's Magic Vol. 2 (Venus, 2007)
 A Fine Romance (Venus, 2007)
 A Lovely Way to Spend an Evening (Venus, 2007)
 Secret Love (Venus, 2008)
 A Handful of Stars (Venus, 2009)
 Portraits of Love (Venus, 2009)
 Ballad Higgins (Venus, 2015)
 Standard Higgins (Venus, 2015)

With Peggy Lee
 Miss Peggy Lee Sings the Blues (Musicmasters, 1988)
 The Peggy Lee Songbook: There'll Be Another Spring (Musical Heritage Society, 1990)
 Love Held Lightly: Rare Songs by Harold Arlen (Angel, 1993)

With Maureen McGovern
 Naughty Baby (CBS, 1989)
 Baby I'm Yours (BMG, 1992)
 A Long and Winding Road (PS Classics, 2008)

With Gerry Mulligan
 Walk on the Water (DRG 1980)
 Little Big Horn (GRP 1983)
 Soft Lights & Sweet Music (Concord Jazz, 1986)

With Harold Ousley
 The Kid! (Cobblestone, 1972)
 The People's Groove (Muse, 1977)
 Sweet Double Hipness (Muse, 1980)

With others
 Benny Bailey, The Satchmo Legacy (Enja, 2000)
 Kenny Barron, Super Standard (Venus, 2004)
 Terence Blanchard, Clockers (Columbia, 1995)
 Teresa Brewer, American Music Box Vol. 2 (Red Baron, 1993)
 John Bunch, Bucky Pizzarelli, NY Swing (LRC, 1992)
 Ann Hampton Callaway, After Ours (Denon, 1997)
 Canadian Brass, James Galway, Noel (RCA Victor, 1994)
 Kvitka Cisyk, Kvitka (KMC, 1980)
 Steve Clayton, Love Is Said in Many Ways (Stash, 1991)
 Cynthia Crane, Mike Renzi, Smoky Bar Songs for the No Smoking Section (Lookoutjazz, 1994)
 Cynthia Crane, Cynthia's in Love (Lookoutjazz, 1997)
 Queen Latifah, The Dana Owens Album (A&M, 2004)
 Roger Daltrey, Rocks in the Head (Atlantic, 1992)
 Blossom Dearie, Positively Volume VII (Daffodil, 1983)
 Blossom Dearie, Mike Renzi, Tweedledum and Tweedledee (Daffodil, 1991)
 Donald Fagen, Sunken Condos (Reprise, 2012)
 Carlos Franzetti, The Jazz Kamerata (Chesky 2005)
 Robert Gordon, Bad Boy (One Way/BMG 1997)
 Wycliffe Gordon, This Rhythm on My Mind (Bluesback, 2006)
 Urbie Green, Green Power (Project 3, 1971)
 Corky Hale, Harp Beat (Stash, 1985)
 Jane Harvey, The Other Side of Sondheim (Atlantic, 1988)
 Skitch Henderson, Bucky Pizzarelli, Legends (Arbors, 2003)
 Nicole Henry, Teach Me Tonight (Venus, 2005)
 Per Husby, If You Could See Me Now (Gemini, 1996)
 Dick Hyman, Swing Is Here (Reference, 1996)
 Dick Hyman, You're My Everything (Venus, 2012)
 Garland Jeffreys, Don't Call Me Buckwheat (RCA, 1991)
 Etta Jones, At Last (Muse, 1995)
 Hank Jones, Arigato (Progressive, 1989)
 Morgana King, Portraits (Muse, 1984)
 Peggy King, Peggy King Sings Jerome Kern (Stash, 1985)
 Lee Konitz, Dovetail (Sunnyside, 1985)
 Karin Krog, Georgie Fame, On a Misty Night (Odin, 2018)
 Charles Kuralt, Loonis McGlohon, North Carolina Is My Home (Piedmont Airlines, 1985)
 Barbara Lea, Bob Dorough, Dick Sudhalter, Hoagy's Children (Audiophile, 1983)
 Carole Laure, Alibis (RCA Victor/Saravah, 1979)
 Carole Laure, Lewis Furey, Bande Originale Du Film Fantastica (Saravah, 1980)
 Carolyn Leonhart, Steal the Moon (Sunnyside, 2000)
 Michael Leonhart, The Painted Lady Suite (Sunnyside, 2018)
 Marian McPartland, Steely Dan, Marian McPartland's Piano Jazz with Steely Dan (Jazz Alliance, 2005)
 Bette Midler, Some People's Lives (Atlantic, 1990)
 Glenn Miller, In the Digital Mood (GRP, 1983)
 Max Morath, Jonah Man and Other Songs of the Bert Williams Era (Vanguard, 1976)
 Max Morath, Jonah Man: A Tribute to Bert Williams (Vanguard, 1996)
 Michael Moriarty, Sweet 'n' Gritty (Disques Swing, 1991)
 Gerry Mulligan, Walk on the Water (DRG, 1980)
 Mark Murphy, Lucky to Be Me (HighNote, 2002)
 Jeanne Napoli, Jeanne (Vigor, 1976)
 Gerry Niewood, Share My Dream (DMP, 1985)
 Anita O'Day, S Wonderful Big Band Concert 1985 (Emily, 1985)
 Graham Parker, Steady Nerves (Elektra, 1985)
 Houston Person, Christmas with Houston Person and Friends (Muse, 1994)
 Peter, Paul & Mary, No Easy Walk to Freedom (Mercury, 1986)
 Bucky Pizzarelli, Five for Freddie (Arbors, 2006)
 Bucky Pizzarelli, Plays the Music of Jerome Kern (LRC, 2006)
 David Pomeranz, Time to Fly (Decca, 1971)
 Jim Pugh, Eijiro Nakagawa, Just Us (E'nJ, 2006)
 Leon Redbone, Any Time (Blue Thumb, 2001)
 Trudy Richards, Manhattan Serenade (Beekman Place, 1990)
 Earl Rose, Take My Breath Away (Sony, 1997)
 Annie Ross, Music Is Forever (DRG, 1996)
 Cynthia Sayer, String Swing (Jazzology, 2000)
 Michel Sardaby, Night Blossom (DIW, 1990)
 Don Sebesky, Full Cycle (Paddle Wheel, 1983)
 Don Sebesky, Moving Lines (Doctor Jazz, 1985)
 Carly Simon, My Romance  (Arista, 1990)
 Paul Simon, Songs from The Capeman (Warner Bros., 1997)
 Tessa Souter, Nights of Key Largo (Venus, 2008)
 Grady Tate, From the Heart (Half Note, 2006)
 James Taylor, Never Die Young (Columbia, 1988)
 Mel Torme, Mel Torme and Friends (Finesse, 1981)
 Mel Torme, Encore at Marty's New York (Flair, 1982)
 Marlene VerPlanck, A Warmer Place (Audiophile, 1982)
 Marlene VerPlanck, I Like to Sing! (Audiophile, 1984)
 Was (Not Was), Born to Laugh at Tornadoes (Geffen, 1983)
 Chuck Wayne, Traveling (Progressive, 1980)
 Fred Wesley, It Don't Mean a Thing If It Ain't Got That Swing (Sons of Sound, 2006)
 Iris Williams, I'm Glad There Is You (1995)

See also 
 Secrets Every Smart Traveler Should Know, musical comedy revue

References

External links
 Official Site
 All About Jazz review of album "Cool" - March 23, 2005
NAMM Oral History Interview May 4, 2013

1940 births
Living people
Musicians from Baltimore
Berklee College of Music alumni
American jazz double-bassists
Male double-bassists
Songwriters from Maryland
Jazz musicians from Maryland
21st-century double-bassists
21st-century American male musicians
American male jazz musicians
Statesmen of Jazz members
Sunnyside Records artists
American male songwriters